The European Conservatives and Reformists Party (ECR Party), formerly known as Alliance of European Conservatives and Reformists (AECR) (2009–2016) and Alliance of Conservatives and Reformists in Europe (ACRE) (2016–2019), is a conservative, soft Eurosceptic European political party with a main focus on reforming the European Union (EU) on the basis of Eurorealism, as opposed to total rejection of the EU (anti-EU-ism). It currently has twenty-four member parties and three further independent members from twenty-one countries, in addition to seven regional partners worldwide.

The political movement was founded on 1 October 2009, after the creation of the European Conservatives and Reformists (ECR) political group of the European Parliament. It was officially recognised by the European Parliament in January 2010.

ECR is governed by a board of directors who are elected by the Council, which represents all ECR member parties. The executive board is composed of the President Giorgia Meloni, Vicepresident Jorge Buxadé MEP from Spain, and Vicepresident Radosław Fogiel MP from Poland.

The party is affiliated with the European Conservatives and Reformists Group in the European Parliament, the pan-European think tank New Direction – The Foundation for European Reform, and the youth organisation the European Young Conservatives. It is also formally associated with the European Conservatives and Reformists Group in the Committee of the Regions, in the Congress of the Council of Europe, and in the NATO Parliamentary Assembly. In the Parliamentary Assembly of the Council of Europe, the ECR Party forms the European Conservatives Group and Democratic Alliance with the Identity and Democracy Party.

History
The European Conservatives and Reformists Party was founded as the Alliance of European Conservatives and Reformists on 1 October 2009, after the ECR political group was founded in the wake of the 2009 European Parliament election, and was officially recognised by the European Parliament in January 2010. Amongst ACRE's eight founding members the largest were the UK Conservative Party, the Polish PiS and the Czech ODS.

ECR was formally constituted under the chairmanship of Belgian MEP Derk Jan Eppink, who was succeeded by Czech MEP Jan Zahradil. At ACRE's first congress was in Warsaw on 8 June 2010, attended by its founding members, including UK Conservative Party Chairman and Czech Prime Minister Mirek Topolanek. On 25 March 2011, the Civic Conservative Party from Slovakia joined; Iceland's Independence Party in November 2011 (the party's first member from outside the European Union); Georgia's Christian-Democratic Movement in August 2012; Italy's Conservatives and Social Reformers in October 2012; the Conservative Party of Canada became the ACRE's first associate member (later renamed 'regional partners') in November 2012; Turkey's ruling Justice and Development Party in November 2013; and the Faroe Islands' People's Party, and Romania's New Republic; and in July 2014, Prosperous Armenia. The Conservative Party of Georgia and New Majority joined on 1 November 2014.  At the same time, the ACRE formally affiliated to the European Conservatives Group in the Parliamentary Assembly of the Council of Europe. In November 2015, the Conservatives and Reformists of Italy were admitted as ECR Party members, followed by the Alliance for Progress and Renewal (ALFA) of Germany and M10 party of Romania in March 2016. The Liberal Party of Australia, Istiqlal Party of Morocco, National Party of New Zealand, and Republican Party of the United States joined as further regional partners in 2014, followed by Afek Tounes and Likud Movement in 2015 and 2016.

The Alliance of European Conservatives and Reformists officially changed its name to the Alliance of Conservatives and Reformists in Europe (ACRE) on 6 October 2016.

In December 2018, ACRE was ordered to repay more than half a million euros of EU funds, following an investigation into their spending. This included €250,000 for a three-day conference in Miami and €90,000 for a trade meeting in Kampala. ACRE had previously been asked to return €121,000 given to the Prosperous Armenia party.

More recently the ECR has seen a shift further towards the conservative right with the acceptance of the Brothers of Italy, Forum for Democracy, Vox and Sweden Democrats as members in 2019.

Members

Member parties
The following parties listed below are members of the ECRP as of 2021.

Regional partners

Former member parties
 : Prosperous Armenia (until 2022)
 : Popular Front Party of Whole Azerbaijan (until 2022)
 : Libertarian, Direct, Democratic (2010–14)
 : Reload Bulgaria (until 2019)
 : Croatian Conservative Party (until 2021, dissolved)
 : People's Party (until 2022)
 : Finns Party (2015–17)
 : Blue Reform (until 2022)
 : France Arise (2019–20)
 : Conservative Party of Georgia (2014–2022)
 : Hungarian Democratic Forum (2009–11)
 : Independence Party (2011–2021)
 : Conservatives and Social Reformers (2012–14)
 : Direction Italy (2017–2022; merged into fellow ECR member Brothers of Italy in 2019)
 : Democratic Party of Kosovo (until 2022)
 : For Fatherland and Freedom/LNNK (2009–11; merged in 2011 into National Alliance, which became a member in 2014)
 : Șor Party (2018–22)
 : Istiqlal Party (2014–18)
 : Movement for Changes (until 2022)
 : Forum for Democracy (until 2020)
 : National Unity Party (until 2022)
 : Poland Comes First (2010–13, dissolved)
 :  New Republic (2013–18)
 : Civic Conservative Party (2009–22)
 : New Majority (until 2021)
 : Justice and Development Party (2013–18)
 : Conservative Party (2009–21)

Former regional partners
 : Liberal Party (until 2022)
 : Conservative Party (until 2022)
 : Democratic Center (until 2022)
 : Jubilee Party (until 2022)
 : Progressive Party of Maldives (until 2022)
 : National Party (until 2022)
 : Chadema (until 2022)
 : Afek Tounes (until 2019)

Elected representatives of member parties

European institutions

ECR affiliate groupings
The ACRE is formally affiliated to groupings in the European Parliament and the Committee of the Regions of the European Union, the Congress of the Council of Europe and the Parliamentary Assembly of the Council of Europe and the NATO Parliamentary Assembly.

European Parliament

The ECR group is the sixth-largest group in the European Parliament. Founded in 2009, the ECR brings together 64 MEPs from 15 countries. The ECR currently is led by two co-chairmen, Ryszard Legutko of the Polish Law and Justice party and Raffaele Fitto of the Brothers of Italy party.

Committee of the Regions
Following the creation of the ECR Group in the European Parliament in 2009, and the creation of the ACRE in 2010, the ECR Group in the Committee of the Regions was formed on 10 April 2013 under the leadership of Gordon Keymer CBE and with the support of the ACRE. The Group was officially announced during the 11–12 April 100th Committee of the Regions plenary session.

The ECR Group was the first Group to be formed in the Committee of the Regions during the course of a mandate and was the first ECR Group to be formed outside of the European Parliament.

The President of the Group is Cllr. Gordon Keymer CBE (Leader of Tandridge District Council) and the Vice-Presidents are Dan Jiránek (Mayor of Kladno) and Daiva Matonienė (Deputy Mayor of Šiauliai City Council). Adam Banaszak (Member of the Kujawsko-Pomorskie regional assembly), Cllr. Kay Twitchen OBE (Member of Essex County Council) and Cllr. Judith Pearce (Deputy Leader of Wychavon District Council and Executive board member for Planning, Infrastructure and Housing).

Parliamentary Assembly of the Council of Europe

The European Conservatives Group in the European Parliament, founded in 1970 and existing for most of its history as the 'European Democrat Group' became officially affiliated to the ACRE on 29 September 2014. The EC group is led by Samad Seyidov MP, of the New Azerbaijan Party.

As of 23 October 2014, the European Conservatives have the following members:

Congress of the Council of Europe
The ECR group in the Congress of the Council of Europe brings together representatives in local government from across Europe. It has 31 members, 26 of whom represent parties in the ECRP.

Youth organisation

European Young Conservatives

The European Young Conservatives (EYC) is ECR Party's youth wing. It brings together conservative and political parties from across Europe. As of 2020, the group has a membership of 30 political youth organisations from 30 countries and territories. Its patron was Margaret Thatcher until her death in 2013.

Principles
ECRP adopted the Reykjavík Declaration at its Council Meeting on 21 March 2014. The declaration defines the principles that underpin ECR.

The Reykjavík Declaration
The European Conservatives and Reformists Party brings together parties committed to individual liberty, national sovereignty, parliamentary democracy, the rule of law, private property, low taxes, sound money, free trade, open competition, and the devolution of power.
ECRP believes in a Europe of independent nations, working together for mutual gain while each retaining its identity and integrity.
ECRP is committed to the equality of all European democracies, whatever their size, and regardless of which international associations they join.
ECRP favors the exercise of power at the lowest practicable level—by the individual where possible, by local or national authorities in preference to supranational bodies.
ECRP understands that open societies rest upon the dignity and autonomy of the individual, who should be as free as possible from state coercion. The liberty of the individual includes freedom of religion and worship, freedom of speech and expression, freedom of movement and association, freedom of contract and employment, and freedom from oppressive, arbitrary or punitive taxation.
ECRP recognizes the equality of all citizens before the law, regardless of ethnicity, sex or social class. It rejects all forms of extremism, authoritarianism and racism.
ECRP cherishes the important role of civil associations, families and other bodies that fill the space between the individual and the government.
ECRP acknowledges the unique democratic legitimacy of the nation-state.
ECRP is committed to the spread of free commerce and open competition, in Europe and globally.
ECRP supports the principles of the Prague Declaration of March 2009 and the work of the European Conservatives and Reformists in the European Parliament and allied groups on the other European assemblies.

See also

 European Conservatives
 European People's Party

Notes

References

External links

European Conservatives and Reformists Party Official website

 
Political parties established in 2009
Pan-European political parties
Conservative parties in Europe
International Democrat Union
Centre-right parties in Europe
Right-wing parties in Europe
Eurosceptic parties
Organisations associated with the Conservative Party (UK)
Organisations based in Brussels
2009 establishments in Europe